Don McMorris (born July 12, 1961) is a Canadian provincial politician, in the province of Saskatchewan. He is the Saskatchewan Party member of the Legislative Assembly of Saskatchewan for the constituency of Indian Head-Milestone, a position he has held since the 1999 provincial election when he was elected as a member of the Saskatchewan Party.  A former Minister of Health, he was the Deputy Premier and Minister of Crown Investments in the Saskatchewan provincial government.

On August 6, 2016, he resigned from the Saskatchewan Party caucus and from Executive Council, where he was the Deputy Premier and minister responsible for Saskatchewan Government Insurance and the Saskatchewan Liquor and Gaming Authority, after being charged with impaired driving the previous day. He later pleaded guilty. On May 13, speaking about the launch of an impaired-driving awareness campaign, he spoke about Saskatchewan's high injury and fatality rates in regard to drinking and driving incidents.

Don is a graduate of Milestone High School and the father of professional snowboarders Mark McMorris and Craig McMorris.

McMorris was re-appointed to cabinet on November 9, 2020 as Minister of Government Relations.

References

External links
Official webpage as the Saskatchewan Minister of Crown Investments

Living people
Independent MLAs in Saskatchewan
Saskatchewan Party MLAs
Politicians from Regina, Saskatchewan
1961 births
Members of the Executive Council of Saskatchewan
21st-century Canadian politicians
Farmers from Saskatchewan
Deputy premiers of Saskatchewan